Dorcopsis is a genus of marsupial in the family Macropodidae. The members of the genus are found on the island of New Guinea.

Species 
The genus contains the following species:

 Black dorcopsis (Dorcopsis atrata)
 White-striped dorcopsis (Dorcopsis hageni)
 Gray dorcopsis (Dorcopsis luctuosa)
 Brown dorcopsis (Dorcopsis muelleri)

References 

Macropods
Marsupial genera
Taxa named by Salomon Müller
Taxa named by Hermann Schlegel
Taxonomy articles created by Polbot